Janis Cavagna (born 12 March 1995) is an Italian football player who plays for  club Seregno.

Club career

Atalanta

Loan to Trapani 
On 9 August 2015, Cavagna was signed by Serie B side Trapani on a season-long loan deal. On 6 September he made his Serie B debut for Trapani as a substitute replacing Matteo Scozzarella in the 84th minute of a 3–0 home win over Ternana. On 19 September, Cavagna played his first match as a starter, a 1–1 home draw against Virtus Lanciano, he was replaced by Mirko Eramo in the 82nd minute. On 21 November he played his first entire match for Trapani, a 2–1 home win over Modena. Cavagna ended his loan to Trapani with 13 appearances and 1 assist.

Loan to Bassano Virtus and Monopoli 
On 12 July 2016, Cavagna was loaned to Serie C club Bassano Virtus on a season-long loan deal. On 31 July he made his debut for Bassano Virtus in a 5–3 match won at penalties after a 1–1 home draw against Fidelis Andria in the first round of Coppa Italia, he played the entire match. On 7 August he played in a 2–0 home win over Avellino in the second round. On 14 August he played in a 3–0 away defeat against Sampdoria in the third round. On 27 August, Cavagna made his Serie C debut for Bassano Virtus in a 2–1 home win over Reggiana, he played the entire match. In January 2017, Cavagna was re-called to Atalanta leaving Bassano Virtus with only 10 appearances.

On 23 January 2017, Cavagna was signed by Serie C club Monopoli on a 6-month loan deal. On 28 January he made his Serie C debut for Monopoli in a 1–1 home draw against Siracusa, he played the entire match. Cavagna ended his 6-month loan to Monopoli with only 8 appearances.

Loan to Pro Piacenza 
On 10 July 2017, Cavagna was signed by Serie C club Pro Piacenza on a season-long loan deal. On 30 July he made his debut for Pro Piacenza as a substitute replacing Jonathan Aspas in the 62nd minute of a 4–1 away defeat against Vicenza in the first round of Coppa Italia. On 27 August he made his Serie C debut for Pro Piacenza as a substitute replacing Jonathan Aspas in the 88th minute of a 3–1 home win over Giana Erminio. On 8 November, Cavagna played his first match as a starter for Pro Piacenza, a 1–0 home win over Monza, he was replaced by Nicolas La Vigna in the 76th minute. On 12 November he played his first entire match for Pro Piacenza, a 1–1 away draw against Arezzo. Cavangna ended his loan to Pro Piacenza with 31 appearances and 1 assist.

Reggio Audace 
On 21 August 2018, Cavagna joined to Serie D side Reggio Audace on a free-transfer and a 1-year contract. On 16 September he made his Serie D debut for the club in a 1–0 away defeat against Crema, he played the entire match. On 17 March 2019, Cavagna scored his first goal in Serie D for Reggio Audace in the 6th minute of a 2–1 away win over Mezzolara Calcio. Cavagna ended this season with Reggio Audace with 32 appearances, including 29 as a starter, 1 goal and 5 assists and he helped the team to reach the promotion in Serie C for the 2019–20 season, however his contract was not renewed after this season.

Villa d'Almè Valbrembana
In November 2019, Cavagna joined Serie D club A.S.D. Villa d'Almè Valle Brembana Calcio.

Career statistics

Club

References

External links
 

1995 births
Footballers from Bergamo
Living people
Italian footballers
Atalanta B.C. players
Trapani Calcio players
Bassano Virtus 55 S.T. players
S.S. Monopoli 1966 players
A.S. Pro Piacenza 1919 players
A.C. Reggiana 1919 players
U.S.D. Olginatese players
U.S. 1913 Seregno Calcio players
Serie B players
Serie C players
Association football midfielders
Serie D players